Flora Fraser may refer to:

Flora Fraser (writer)
Flora Fraser, 21st Lady Saltoun